Jean-Claude Andruet (born 13 August 1940 in Montreuil) is a retired French professional rally driver who competed in the World Rally Championship.

Andruet took three WRC event wins during his career; 1973 Monte Carlo Rally,  Tour de Corse and  San Remo Rally. The 1973 Monte Carlo was the first ever rally in the FIA World Rally Championship. His best placement in the overall drivers' championship was 13th in 1982. He won a total of five Le Mans 24 hours class wins and the 1977 Spa 24 hours. He also competed in the European Rally Championship he won in 1970 and finished second overall in 1981.

Andruet's son Gilles was a chess player and was murdered in 1995 in murky circumstances.

Complete IMC results

References 

1940 births
French rally drivers
World Rally Championship drivers
Living people
24 Hours of Le Mans drivers
24 Hours of Spa drivers
World Sportscar Championship drivers
European Rally Championship drivers

12 Hours of Reims drivers
French racing drivers
Citroën Racing drivers
Racing Bart Mampaey drivers